Jon Clark is a British lighting designer. 

He won a Tony Award in the category Best Lighting Design in a Play for The Lehman Trilogy on Broadway and an Olivier Award for The Inheritance in the West End. He has received further nominations for both awards.

Jon studied Theatre Design at Bretton Hall UC of Leeds University. He has designed extensively in the West End, on Broadway, for the National Theatre, Royal Shakespeare Company, Royal Opera House, The Metropolitan Opera and with many other companies in the UK and internationally.

References

External links 

Jon Clark's website

Living people
Place of birth missing (living people)
Year of birth missing (living people)
Lighting designers
Tony Award winners
American theatre people

Alumni of Bretton Hall College